The grey-headed mannikin or grey-headed munia (Lonchura caniceps) is a species of estrildid finch, native to the Papuan Peninsula. It has an estimated global extent of occurrence of 50,000 to 100,000 km2. It is found in moist savanna, shrubland & wetlands. The status of the species is evaluated as Least Concern.

References

BirdLife Species Factsheet

grey-headed mannikin
Birds of the Papuan Peninsula
grey-headed mannikin